Darren Oldroyd (born 1 November 1966) is an English former footballer who played in the Football League for Everton and Wolverhampton Wanderers.

External links
 

English footballers
English Football League players
Everton F.C. players
Wolverhampton Wanderers F.C. players
Southport F.C. players
1966 births
Living people
Association football defenders